Collaria is a genus of slime molds in the family Lamprodermataceae.

References

External links
 
 Collaria at Index Fungorum

Myxogastria
Amoebozoa genera